Pingyu County is a county of Henan province, China, bordering Anhui province to the east. It is under the administration of Zhumadian city.

Notable people 
It is the hometown of the following people:

 Chen Fan and Xi Zhong, who were famous Chinese historical persons
 Chen Quanguo, the Chinese Communist Party Politburo member

Pingyu County is also the birthplace of the Chinese surnames Shěn and Ran.

Administrative divisions
As 2017, this county is divided to 3 subdistricts, 11 towns and 5 townships.
Subdistricts
Guhuai Subdistrict
Qinghe Subdistrict
Donghuang Subdistrict

Towns

Townships

Climate

References

County-level divisions of Henan
Zhumadian